Thein Aung was the Chief Minister of Ayeyarwady Region, Myanmar from 2011 to 2016. He is a former brigadier-general in the Myanmar Army and was a member of the ruling military junta, the State Peace and Development Council. He is also a former Minister for Forestry.

A member of the Union Solidarity and Development Party, he won an uncontested seat to represent Ingapu Township Constituency No. 1 as an Ayeyarwady Region Hluttaw representative in the 2010 Burmese general election.

Personal life 
Thein Aung's son Zaw Hein is a major-general in the Burmese armed forces and the incumbent commander of the Naypyidaw Command.

References

Forestry ministers of Myanmar
Union Solidarity and Development Party politicians
Living people
Burmese military personnel
Year of birth missing (living people)